Sauvere is a village in Saaremaa Parish in Saare County in western Estonia.

As of 1 January 2007, Sauvere has a population of 68.

Before the administrative reform in 2017, the village was in Lääne-Saare Parish.

References

Villages in Saare County